Tex Granger is a 1948 American Western film serial featuring the title character as a masked cowboy referred to as The Midnight Rider of the Plains in the serial's subtitle. It was based on a character from the comic Calling All Boys while the plot was taken from The Last Frontier (1926), which was itself based on the novel of the same name by Courtney Ryley Cooper. Tex Granger was the 36th of the 57 serials released by Columbia.

Plot
When Tex Granger rides into Three Buttes, Helen Kent persuades him to buy the local newspaper office. However, loan shark Rance Carson appoints the bandit Blaze Talbot as town marshal to act as his enforcer and soon the town is in chaos. With fighting between rival gangs, Tex dons a mask to become "The Midnight Rider of the Plains" and bring the criminals to justice.

Cast
 Robert Kellard as Tex Granger, The Night Rider
 Peggy Stewart as Helen Kent
 Robert 'Buzz' Henry as Timmy Perkins (as Buzz Henry)
 Smith Ballew as Marshal Blaze
 Jack Ingram as Reno, Gang Leader
 I. Stanford Jolley as Rance Carson
 Terry Frost as Luke Adams, Carson Henchman [Chs.1-6]
 Jim Diehl as Conroy, Carson Henchmen 
 Britt Wood as Sandy White 
 Tiny Brauer as Morgan Carson Henchmen (as Bill Brauer)
 Duke as Duke, the Dog (as Duke the Wonder Dog)

Chapter titles
 Tex Finds Trouble
 Rider of Mystery Mesa
 Dead or Alive
 Dangerous Trails
 Renegade Pass
 A Crooked Deal
 The Rider Unmasked
 Mystery of the Silver Ghost
 The Rider Trapped
 Midnight Ambush
 Renegade Roundup
 Carson's Last Draw
 Blaze Takes Over
 Riding Wild
 The Rider Meets Blaze
Source:

See also
 List of film serials
 List of film serials by studio

References

External links

 
Calling All Boys (by cover image) at Comic Vine featuring Tex Granger

1948 films
American black-and-white films
Columbia Pictures film serials
1940s English-language films
Films based on American comics
Films based on American novels
Films based on multiple works
1948 Western (genre) films
Films with screenplays by Harry L. Fraser
American Western (genre) films
Films with screenplays by George H. Plympton
Films directed by Derwin Abrahams
1940s American films